Sminthurinus latimaculosus is a species of globular springtail in the family Katiannidae.

References

Collembola
Articles created by Qbugbot
Animals described in 1951